Electric Messiah is the eighth studio album by American metal band High on Fire, released on October 5, 2018 through Entertainment One Music. It is the band's third album to be produced by Kurt Ballou, and it serves as a tribute to Lemmy Kilmister of the band Motörhead. On August 6, 2018, Electric Messiahs title track was released early for streaming. On October 3, 2018, the band released "Spewn from the Earth" as the album's second single.  The song "Electric Messiah" won the Best Metal Performance at the 2019 Grammy Awards. It is the band's last album with founding drummer Des Kensel, who announced his departure in July 2019.

Background
In July 2018, a few months after High on Fire frontman Matt Pike's other primary band, Sleep, released its comeback album, Electric Messiah was announced. Pike called it "the best album we've ever done, by far", and described its flow as "one stream of High on Fire consciousness".

Track listing

PersonnelHigh on FireMatt Pike – lead vocals, guitars
Jeff Matz – bass, backing vocals
Des Kensel – drums, backing vocalsTechnical personnel'
Kurt Ballou – production

Accolades

Awards 

 Grammy Awards  
 Best Metal Performance "Electric Messiah" by High on Fire

Charts

References

2018 albums
High on Fire albums
Albums produced by Kurt Ballou